Mali is a landlocked country in West Africa. The country's economy centers on agriculture and fishing. Some of Mali's prominent natural resources include gold, being the third largest producer of gold in the African continent, and salt. About half the population lives below the international poverty line of $1.25 (U.S.) a day.

Notable firms 
This list includes notable companies with primary headquarters located in the country. The industry and sector follow the Industry Classification Benchmark framework. Organizations which have ceased operations are included and noted as defunct.

See also 
 Economy of Mali

References 

Mali
Companies of Mali